Elora may refer to:
 Elora, Ontario, a community in Ontario, Canada
 Elora, Tennessee, an unincorporated community in Lincoln County, Tennessee, United States
 Elora the Faun, a character in the Spyro the Dragon series video games
 Elora Danan, a character in the 1988 film Willow
 Elora Werkzeugfabrik GmbH, a German tool manufacturer.
 Elora (given name)

Elora: a Hebrew name meaning God is my light or shield of victory